, also known as "A Cruel Angel's Thesis", is a J-pop song performed by Japanese singer Yoko Takahashi. Toshiyuki Ōmori and Hidetoshi Satō composed the song, while Neko Oikawa wrote the lyrics. It was written for the opening theme of the anime television series Neon Genesis Evangelion, and was released as a double-A-sided single with "Fly Me to the Moon", the show's closing theme, on October 25, 1995. "The Cruel Angel's Thesis" was also included in the series' soundtrack releases and Takahashi's albums.

The song had a positive reception from music critics and audiences; it later became one of the most famous Japanese anisongs, songs specially created for anime series. Years after the show's first airing, "A Cruel Angel's Thesis" has remained a popular Japanese karaoke song, winning popularity polls and awards. On the Internet, along with its official video, the song gained further fame through covers and parodies, becoming one of the most famous theme songs in the history of animation.

Background and recording

During the production of Neon Genesis Evangelion, the show's director Hideaki Anno suggested using an existing piece of classical music as the series' opening theme. He first chose the Polovtsian Dances from the opera Prince Igor by Russian composer Aleksander Borodin. TV Tokyo rejected the proposal, judging such a piece unsuitable for the show; a classical composition from Prince Igor would have been, according to the producers, "unclear". Neon Genesis Evangelion production studio Gainax then contacted Hidetoshi Satō and Toshiyuki Ōmori to write an original piece in place of the soundtrack's main composer Shiro Sagisu. Although not officially credited, Toshimichi Ōtsuki, a member of King Records and the official producer of the animated series, coordinated production. The music was composed in the key of C minor, and during the demo stage Ōtsuki requested a melody with a "crispy notching style". 

Singer Yoko Takahashi, who was already known for singing Japanese television themes, was contacted for the recording; at the time of the recording of "A Cruel Angel's Thesis", Takahashi had not seen the anime and was not given any information about it. Ōmori finished the arrangement, albeit roughly, and Takahashi established a temporary track by singing the melody with only the syllable "la". Once the final lyrics were ready, Takahashi, then almost thirty years old, was asked to adopt a childlike tone of voice. When she received a demo of the base to rehearse with, Takahashi found the song difficult because of both Oikawa's chosen language register and the song's fast tempo. A male backing choir was originally planned but was later deleted by Anno to emphasize the concept of "motherhood" on the recording.

Composition and lyrics

Neko Oikawa was given the task of writing the lyrics; Ōtsuki instructed her to write something "philosophical" and to use complicated language. She focused on the key concepts of "mother", "boys and girls of fourteen" and "an adult woman". Oikawa, following the directives, completed the song in two hours, after having received few details of the anime and without having met Hidetoshi Satō. Oikawa and her manager watched the show's first two extant episodes and a document presenting the project. The author had in mind the figure of a mother who does not want her son to become an adult, and wrote ambiguous lyrics with an abundance of stylistic devices. For the woman, the boy is still innocent and naive; he looks at her, smiles and says nothing, and she gently invites him to rest. The woman, reassuring him their meeting was chosen by fate, says; "On your back you have feathers that will carry you into the future".

For the title, Oikawa used the German word  from philosophical terminology. Yahoo! Japan has noted the concept of These has been used, among others, by Georg Wilhelm Friedrich Hegel, philosopher and exponent of German idealism. Oikawa also took inspiration from the manga , which was written by Moto Hagio and was being published at the time, and inserted the term , which usually refers to the angels of Christianity. An additional religious reference, the verse  ("This is the Bible with which you will learn what freedom is"), was added to the lyrics. At first, she thought of ending the song with the motto , which can also be translated as "become crazy" if written with kanji , but the proposal was shelved under the advice of TV Tokyo, which requested a change to "shin wa ni nare" ("become a myth"). The ending with an imperative remained, keeping the idea of an adult addressing a young boy. According to Comic Book Resources's Devin Meenan, the lyrics could refer to Yui Ikari, mother of protagonist Shinji who protects him during the events of the series, or Misato Katsuragi, his superior who encourages him "to come out of his shell". Kotono Mitsuishi, Misato's Japanese voice actress, gave a similar interpretation; in an interview, Mitsuishi stated that the lyric  "pierced" her heart, believing "that was Misato's voice".

The chorus was sung by Ōmori, Takahashi, and her brother Gō Takahashi.

Release
The second version was reissued on March 26, 2003, for the release of the Renewal Edition of Neon Genesis Evangelion. "The Cruel Angel's Thesis" was also included on albums dedicated to the anime soundtracks, starting with Neon Genesis Evangelion I, released on November 22, 1995; in the following Neon Genesis Evangelion II, released on February 16, 1996, the shorter "TV Size Version", which was used for broadcast by TV Tokyo, was also included.

The song was included in other releases, such as the special box set The Day of Second Impact (September 13, 2000), Neon Genesis Evangelion: S² Works (December 4, 1998), Refrain of Evangelion (May 23, 2003), Neon Genesis Evangelion Decade (November 26, 2005), A. T. EVA01 Reference CD (December 21, 2007), Shin Godzilla vs Evangelion Symphony (December 27, 2017), Evangelion Finally (October 2020), and Neon Genesis Evangelion Soundtrack 25th Anniversary Box, a box containing several versions of the theme song. The track was later included on unrelated compilations, such as the Star Child Selection (28 January 2000), various Super Robot Tamashii anthologies in various mixes, pop'n music 12 Iroha AC CS pop'n music 10 (13 April 2005), Kids Song★Hit Paradise! (26 September 2008), Brass Band Koushien 3 (27 February 2008), and Nekoism 〜 Neko Oikawa Sakuhin-shū (21 February 2018).

Reception

"The Cruel Angel's Thesis" enjoyed long-lasting success and frequently appeared in popularity polls even decades after the first airing of Evangelion. It is considered one of the best and most iconic theme songs of the otaku subculture, finding renewed popularity with the release of the Rebuild of Evangelion theatrical tetralogy. In 1996 and 1997, after the first broadcast of Neon Genesis Evangelion, "The Cruel Angel's Thesis" was elected best theme song of the moment in the Anime Grand Prix, an annual poll conducted by the magazine Animage; in the second year, it got more than twice as many votes as the second-placed song, Give a Reason by Megumi Hayashibara.

In a 2002 poll on the most-unforgettable songs in the history of Japanese animation, conducted by TV Asahi, the song was placed 55th; it later reached 18th place in the same channel's ranking of best anime songs produced during and after the 1990s. In 2016, the song was ranked top in a poll of the favorite anisongs of the 1990s by Anime News Network users and one of the best-ever anisongs in a poll of almost 7,000 people by CD & DL Data magazine. In 2018, Japanese website Anime Anime asked its users which cartoon soundtracks they would like as their national anthem; "The Cruel Angel's Thesis" took third place. The following year, it came second in a survey of the most-sung titles by the female audience on the website Merumo.

Critical reception
Critics positively received "The Cruel Angel's Thesis". Axs.com's Terrance Pyror and Otaku Kart included the song in their lists of the best theme songs in the history of Japanese animation. Casey Baseel of Sora News and Ederlyn Peralta of Comic Book Resources described it as one of the most iconic anime songs. CBR's Eduardo Luquin praised its tone, writing, "'Cruel Angel's Thesis' is a hype train that starts the trippy trip to the destinations known as philosophy, religion, and teenage angst. Like a starting shot at the start of the race, it implores the watcher to go headlong into the show and try to take in everything Evangelion has to offer."

For Lauren Orsini of Forbes and Noah Black of Mcccagora.com, the song is "instantly" and "devastatingly catchy". Matt Fagaly of Crunchyroll and Tom Pinchuk of Geek & Sundry praised the contrast between the dark, pessimistic themes of its parent series and the song's lighthearted tone. This view was echoed by the Anime-Planet website, which said, "It's a great piece of music, which is quite rare for anime openings these days". Upon the anime's release on Netflix, the theme song was again analyzed and reviewed. David Levesley of Gentlemen's Quarterly described it as an "exceptional" song while Junichi Tsukagoshi of Animate Times called it "a holy chant that everyone knows". Italian writer Laura Mucci of Everyeye.it called it "a curious element of cultural folklore", "a kind of Japanese counterpart to [the Italian] Nel blu, dipinto di blu". Comic Book Resources similarly ranked "A Cruel Angel's Thesis" as the best theme song of the 1990s and the third-most beautiful of all time.

Legacy
"The Cruel Angel's Thesis" has been described by the website Sora News as an "unqualified hit" that transcended anime fandom, and by Crunchyroll's
Kara Dennison as "one of the most recognizable [themes] in anime history". According to Anime Maru, it also had a significant cultural impact, and its presence "has become a staple of otaku culture". Throughout the years, the song spawned memes and parody edits. Music anime douga (MAD) began to circulate on websites, with tribute video clips aimed at recreating the song's music and video; according to Comic Book Resources's Angelo Delos Trinos, it has been "endlessly covered and edited more so than anything from the actual anime. Even anime newcomers who have yet to watch anything from Evangelion are already familiar with its opening because of its undying online presence". Through the years, these parodies spread on the web and the music video continued to be homaged by Internet users through remixes, mash-ups, and covers.

In 2018, a Twitter user combined the song with a video clip of LMFAO's "Party Rock Anthem"; the parody video went viral and "Party Rock Anthem" also became a meme with dozens of variations on several social media platforms. In August 2019, Italian football club S.S. Monopoli 1966 opened a vote for its fans to choose the team's cheering song to be sung when the team scored goals; "A Cruel Angel's Thesis" finished second to "7 Miliardi" by Massimo Pericolo. The following year, during the COVID-19 lockdown period, a video was uploaded with Italians singing from the balconies of their homes and edited with "The Cruel Angel's Thesis" in the background; the quarantine video also went viral.

Merchandise and other uses

"A Cruel Angel's Thesis" was used in Evangelion-inspired video games and pachinko machines. In August 1997, the Japanese magazine June, specialized in homoerotic manga and anime (shonen-ai), issued a volume entitled , the title of which is taken from the first verse of the theme song. In 2014, Sony released a special DAT walkman about the series in homage to the one used by Shinji's character; included in the package was a card from the Japanese music store Mora that allowed customers to download the original version of "The Cruel Angel's Thesis" in Sony Stores in Ginza, Nagoya, and Osaka. The following year, to celebrate the twentieth anniversary of the first airing of the anime, a musical road playing the song was built in Hakone, near which the series' fictional city Tokyo-3 is located; through jolts caused by grooves in the asphalt, a person driving at an optimal speed of  could hear the song along a scenic route at Lake Ashi.

In 2018, Evastore, an official store entirely dedicated to the series, advertised the release of the single in a restored digital format and produced new Evangelion-related merchandise, such as t-shirts, posters, and metallic postcards. On May 5 of the same year, the piece was included in an official cross-over episode between Neon Genesis Evangelion and the animated series Shinkansen Henkei Robo Shinkalion. On December 26, Takahashi performed "A Cruel Angel's Thesis" at the opening of an izakaya club dedicated to the series; a drink named "Zankoku na tenshi no these" was also released. In 2019, in conjunction with the anime's launch on Netflix, Japanese singer Toshi performed the song during a performance of the ice-skating show Fantasy on Ice. American wrestler Dio Maddin, a fan of Neon Genesis Evangelion, named one of his final moves "Cruel Angel's Thesis" after the song. In 2020, an Evangelion-themed event was held at the Tokyo Sky Tree, during which the video of the song was shown at the tower's observatory; the event ran until May of the following year. "The Cruel Angel's Thesis" was also used in an episode of Seiyu's Life! and homaged in other animated series, such as Hayate the Combat Butler, and Regular Show.

Commercial performance

In Japan, "A Cruel Angel's Thesis" gained popularity, remaining for years in the Oricon Karaoke Chart. The original version of the song was released as a single on October 25, 1995, and charted twenty-two times on the weekly Oricon charts, peaking at number twenty-seven. It was later re-released together with Claire's cover of "Fly Me to the Moon" and stayed on the chart for sixty-one weeks. In 1997, shortly after the end of the anime's first airing and the release of the movie Neon Genesis Evangelion: Death & Rebirth, "A Cruel Angel's Thesis" was awarded the gold and diamond record (named "Million" in Japan), while the edition with "Fly Me to the Moon" was certified platinum. The 2003 version stayed on the chart for nine weeks. A remix done in 2009 was also successful; in June and July of that year, "A Cruel Angel's Thesis" became the most popular anisong of the period, appeared for fourteen weeks on the Oricon charts, and reached number twenty-two. Sales of the various versions collectively sold more than one million copies.

In 2011, fifteen years after its debut, the Japanese Society for Rights of Authors, Composers and Publishers honored the song by placing it first in the JASRAC Awards, a special ranking of the most-profitable royalty pieces in Japanese music, calculated among other things through digital sales, pachinko, and karaoke. The song had already appeared on the charts in previous years: in 2008 it peaked at number seven, number eight in 2009, and number three in 2007. In May 2012, "A Cruel Angel's Thesis" was certified three-times platinum by the Recording Industry Association of Japan.

"A Cruel Angel's Thesis" remains one of the most popular songs in Japanese karaoke. In 2013, it placed third in a Koebu.com poll about the favorite karaoke songs by voice actors. In 2014, the company Joysound placed it at number one on its list of the year's most-popular anime theme songs. The song reappeared among the twenty most-sung songs of the first half of that same year, and also appeared on previous charts; in 2007, it peaked at number twenty, in 2009 at number two, and in the first week of June 2013 at number six. A similar result was recorded in 2015, when it took first place in a Charapedia's poll of about 10,000 fans' favorite karaoke songs. In March of that year, the website Nico Nico News asked more than 300 adults which animated theme song was the most annoying and whose songs they were most sick of hearing, and "A Cruel Angel's Thesis" won 40.6% of the votes. In 2017, 2019, and 2020, it again listed among the ten most-popular songs on Joysound's Japanese karaoke popularity polls and in Karatetsu's charts. On February 18, 2017, NHK BS Premium broadcast a live program entitled "Countdown Live Anisong Best 100!", in which the single was ranked eighth. Joysound listed it as the most-played song in karaoke in the Heisei period, the previous thirty years of Japanese history, and the second-most-sung anisong of the first half of 2020, after LiSA's "Gurenge".

Music video

Development and release
For "The Cruel Angel's Thesis", Gainax made a ninety-second opening video that was animated by Takeshi Honda and Shinya Hasegawa. The production took some time; it was still unfinished in July 1995, when the first two episodes were premiered at the company's second festival. The music video was completed in September of the same year, shortly before the anime premiered on TV Tokyo. The video consists of approximately 2,160 frames divided into eighty-four scenes, averaging one sequence per second. Gainax staff attempted to create a retro effect, paying homage to and imitating theme songs from previous works. Hideaki Anno's name appears in large letters in the video's last few seconds, and is seemingly cut off by Eva-01's arms, emphasizing the director's strong imprint on every aspect of the series.

A second video for the song's full version was released for the 2003 home video edition of the series named Renewal of Evangelion. The new video was directed by Masayuki, and is different from the one for the television broadcast. The full video includes images from the director's cut of the episodes and scenes from the film Neon Genesis Evangelion: The End of Evangelion (1997). It also includes captions with white characters on a black background, written and coordinated by Hideaki Anno. The video was released in high definition on King Records' official YouTube channel on June 20, 2018.

Synopsis and cultural references
The video of the television version of "A Cruel Angel's thesis" contains several cultural references, most notably to Christianity and Judaism. In the opening frames, a bright blue dot appears and expands like a drop of water surrounded by a circle of the same color. The image, according to the script, represents the beginning of the universe; according to critic Mario Pasqualini, the symbol could refer to the relationship between God and Creation, which some philosophers compared to the relationship between a point and a circumference. After the point of light, a figure with twelve wings on a red background, similar to some representations of cherubic angels, appears. This is followed by a celestial flame, which refers to the concept of the soul or "life breath" and which plays a role in the series. The image also depicts the first light seen by a newborn child. Further religious symbolism consists of a dual depiction of the Kabbalistic tree of life, in reference to the series' Human Instrumentality Project, a plan for the evolution of humanity pursued by the character of Gendo Ikari.

In the latter part, a frame of Rei Ayanami touching a window is glimpsed, with a close-up of her eye as she blinks. This device has been compared by writer Dennis Redmond to a similar image used by director Krzysztof Kieślowski in the film Blue (1993). Alternating on the screen are images of Eva-01's hand covered in blood and 01 unleashing twelve wings of light, along with white captions on a black background and vice versa, maps, pencil sketches, a drawing depicting Kaworu Nagisa, portraits of Misato Katsuragi, Ryōji Kaji and Ritsuko Akagi, the first Angel Adam, and a luminous red sphere. For the light wings of 01, the authors took inspiration from the Christian figure of Lucifer, a fallen angel who, according to traditional iconography, has twelve wings.

The video ends with a text written, according to the official storyboards, in angelic characters; according to Anno, it represents the Dead Sea Scrolls. Neon Genesis Evangelion manga English editor Carl Gustav Horn also compared the calligraphy of the characters to the Sefer Raziel HaMalakh, a Kabbalistic grimoire of Practical Kabbalah.

Reception
The video clip for "The Cruel Angel's Thesis" received praise from audiences and critics. According to Neon Genesis Evangelion: The Unofficial Guide, written by Martin Foster and Kazuhisa Fujie, some viewers were at first confused by seeing the theme song, but after the series' conclusion they noticed that "everything that appeared in the story had been highlighted, flagged or hinted at in the opening sequence". Newtype magazine praised the video, calling it "excellent" and appreciating the large amount of sequences. For Nick Valdez of Comic Book, the video is "chock full of memorable imagery" and "one of the coolest trips down memory lane". Dani Cavallaro, a writer and critic specializing in Japanese animation, cited it as an example of Hideaki Anno's "complexity of animation" and style, describing it as "an intriguing array of mystical symbols, a perfect match of visuals and music and sophisticated framing". According to Cavallaro, "each of the key images elegantly counterbalances another image moving in the opposite direction", such as the two depictions of the Tree of Life, as well as Rei and Asuka's frames, which flow vertically, and Misato's frames, which move horizontally.

Live performances

In 2015, Takahashi sang "The Cruel Angel's Thesis" at the Anime Expo in Los Angeles, California, and in 2017 she performed it during Billboard Live in Tokyo, receiving a warm reception from the audience. On June 20, 2018, she performed the song during the Evangelion World Tour, which was organized to promote the song's re-release with restored and remastered audio along with "Tamashii no rufuran", on stages in Japan, France, and Hong Kong. In June 2019, Takahashi performed at the Japan Expo in Paris, singing songs from the Neon Genesis Evangelion soundtrack just before an official preview of the film Evangelion: 3.0 + 1.0 and in conjunction with the anime's release on Netflix. To mark the occasion, all of Neon Genesis Evangelion I, including "Zankoku na tenshi no these", was added to Spotify on June 21.

In 2020, an event dedicated to Evangelion Operation Yashima was announced in Hakone, a city where the show's fictional city Tokyo-3 is located. During the event, held on March 28 and May 23, a live performance of Takahashi's "The Cruel Angel's Thesis" was planned, but the dates were postponed due to the COVID-19 pandemic. On October 3 of the same year, Takahashi took part in the unveiling of a reproduction of Eva-01 at Toei Kyoto Studio Park in Ukyō-ku, singing "Zankoku na tenshi no these" on the palm of the humanoid's hand.

Remixes and other versions
For "Take Care of Yourself", the anime's last episode, Sagisu rearranged the song's accompaniment into the instrumentals "The Heady Feeling of Freedom" and "Good, or Don't Be", arranged for piano, electric piano, acoustic guitar, violins, and cellos. Remixes of the single were added to Dancemania compilations. The Shihori version was included in the albums Dancemania Summer Story 2008 (25 June 2008), Wa-euro Best (5 August 2009), Dancemania Summer Story 2009 (10 June 2009), Best of Wa-euro Best (21 July 2010), the Mint version in Himetra Best (14 May 2008), and Himetra Anime*Mix (21 January 2009), while a version by Diana Gross was included in the compilation Him Trace 3. Other remixes were later included in the Dancemania Speed''' compilations Anime Speed (25 May 2005), Anime Speed Newtype Edition (19 July 2006), Happy Speed (18 April 2007), and Himetra Speed (30 July 2008).

Other versions were included in Takahashi's albums; the arrangement of the original single was copyrighted by King Records, so for legal reasons the record companies that released Takahashi's works had to rely on other arrangements. A "Version '96" was added to the album Best Pieces, released on February 10, 1999, and then included in Super Value Yoko Takahashi, released on February 19, 2001 by Universal Music. In ～refrain～The songs were inspired by Evangelion (November 6, 1997), a remix named "Ambivalence Mix" and an instrumental version titled Epilogue de these edited by Tony Orly were added. A new version of "The Cruel Angel's Thesis" titled "Remix for Peace" was also produced in 1999 and included on Takahashi's album Best Pieces II, which was released on February 10 of that year; as well as Takahashi's hit collections such as Yoko Takahashi Best 10 (January 17, 2007), Yoko Takahashi Essential Best (December 19, 2007) and Golden☆Best Yoko Takahashi, multiple versions of which were released on February 25, 2004, December 5, 2012, and December 5, 2018. An additional remix, "Harmonia Version", was added to LI-La, another album by the performer, that was later reissued in Li-La +3, which was released on October 2, 2013, along with the "Remix for Peace".

In 2005, a new version of the song, again with Takahashi on vocals and forty-seven seconds longer than the original, was recorded for the tenth anniversary of the series. The new version, named "10th Anniversary Edition", was included as the twelfth track in Neon Genesis Evangelion Decade. Michio Nakagoe was the sound and mixing engineer, while the musicians were Mineaki Matsumoto on piano, Tatsu Kase on double bass, Yuichi Tokashiki on drums, Masanobu Fukuhara on electric guitar, Eric Miyagi and Koji Nishimura on trumpet, Eijiro Nakagawa on trombone, Osamu Koike on alto saxophone, Hiroshi Yaginuma on tenor saxophone, and Atsushi Kurokatsuno on bass saxophone. In 2009, Takahashi recorded new versions of "Zankoku na tenshi no these" and "Fly Me to the Moon", which were included in a single released on May 13. The songs were produced in conjunction with the presentation of a pachinko series on Evangelion named ; a cover designed by Takeshi Honda was used for the album. The 2009 version was included in Takahashi's 20th century Boys & Girls collection, released on June 23 of the following year, and, ten years later, in the mini-album Evangelion Extreme, which was released by King Amusement Creative and includes the tracks used in the pachislots dedicated to the series.

In 2015, Takahashi recorded a new version of the composition named "2015 Version" in a single live session with acoustic guitar accompaniment for her thirteenth studio album 20th century Boys & Girls II, which was released on April 22, 2015, by King Records. Two years later, a new arrangement titled "2017 Version" was included in the anthology Yoko Sings Forever (March 22, 2017); the recording was done live with piano by Marashii and organ by Satoshi Takebe. At first, a single titled "Zankoku na tenshi no these ~ Tamashii no rufuran" was planned but not included in the final version. In July 2019, "Zankoku na tenshi no these" was also used in the strategy video game The Battle Cats; Takahashi sang only the word , a Japanese onomatopoeia of meow. The version was later uploaded to Oricon and MaiDiGiTV YouTube channels, and both videos gained more than one million views. In the same year, Eitetsu Hayashi produced a new arrangement of "The Cruel Angel's Thesis" stylistically close to Japanese traditional music and mainly made with taiko instruments; it was premiered on King Amusement Creative's official YouTube channel as "Zankoku na tenshi no these: Matsuri Spirit" and was fully released on July 24 of the same year.

The Chinese broadcaster Shenzhen TV acquired Evangelion for a Chinese-language dubbing; the first translation was not approved by the National Radio and Television Administration, a ministerial agency under the State Council of the People's Republic of China, so the series was translated and dubbed again, removing the contents that were considered inappropriate for a young audience and the theme song was renamed Měilì tiānshǐ de xíngdòng gānglǐng (美丽天使的行动纲领,  "The beautiful angel's plan of action"), also known as Yǒnggǎn de shàonián (勇敢的少年,  "The brave boy"). The anime was then broadcast between 1999 and 2001.

Cover versions

In 1996, the fourth album of the soundtracks of the series, Neon Genesis Evangelion Addition, was released; the album included a track named "Zankoku na tenshi no these (Director's Edit. Version II)", lasting 4:04 minutes and sung by Kotono Mitsuishi, Megumi Hayashibara, and Yūko Miyamura, voice actresses of the three major female characters of the show, respectively: Misato Katsuragi, Rei Ayanami and Asuka Sōryū Langley. On 30 March, 2001, the album The Birthday of Rei Ayanami was released; among the tracks was a cover of "The Cruel Angel's Thesis" performed by Hayashibara. The song was added to bertemu, the artist's seventh album, released on November 1, 1996, and as a bonus track on Center Color, her eleventh, released on January 7, 2004. Hayashibara stated while singing "The Cruel Angel's Thesis" she thought of the scene in which Rei smiles for the first time at Shinji Ikari in the film version of Eva.

Megumi Ogata, Shinji's voice actress, performed the song during her concerts. Junko Iwao, the Japanese voice actress of Hikari Horaki, also recorded her bossa nova version of the song for her album Anime On Bossa, which was released on January 30, 2008.

Other artists have recorded covers of "A Cruel Angel's Thesis", including Shōko Nakagawa, MIQ, Yōko Ishida, Masami Okui, Shizuka Itō, Mikuni Shimokawa, Toshi, Aya Hirano, arlie Ray, Ryō Horikawa, Chihiro Yonekura, Akina Nakamori, Maya Sakura, Konomi Suzuki, Kikuko Inoue, and Natsuki Katō. Music groups, both Japanese and foreign, also performed the song, including Animetal, Anipunk, Globe, Move, Flow, Glay, Glory Gospel Singers, Anime That Jazz!, Max, and Roselia, a band from the media franchise BanG Dream!.

Track listings
Original version: ; All tracks performed by Yoko Takahashi.

"Zankoku na Tenshi no Tēze/Fly Me to the Moon" 

"Zankoku na Tenshi no Tēze/Fly Me to the Moon" (10th Anniversary Renewal): . All tracks performed by Yoko Takahashi, except where noted.

"Zankoku na Tenshi no Tēze'' 2009 VERSION": ; All tracks performed by Yoko Takahashi.

"Zankoku na Tenshi no Tēze/Tamashī no Rufuran" 

"Zankoku na Tenshi no Tēze Matsuri Spirit"

Charts

Weekly charts

Year-end charts

Certifications

Notes

References

Bibliography

External links
 

1995 singles
1995 songs
Animated series theme songs
King Records (Japan) singles
Neon Genesis Evangelion songs
Japanese film songs
Songs with lyrics by Neko Oikawa
Songs written for animated films